Jaro was a charter airline based at Aurel Vlaicu International Airport in Bucharest, Romania. It operated from 1991 to 2001, when it was liquidated by bankruptcy.

History
 Jaro started operations in 1991 at Aurel Vlaicu International Airport, Bucharest's second airport, with one Boeing 707. In the same year, Jaro International started services to JFK International Airport, being the first Romanian airline apart from TAROM to fly over the Atlantic. In July 1997, the airline introduced weekly flights between Aurel Vlaicu and Montreal-Mirabel International Airport and Aurel Vlaicu and Toronto Pearson International Airport, where they stayed until 2000. These routes were abandoned because of the high competition from Tarom which was operating at Dorval and Pearson. In September 2001, the airline declared bankruptcy and made its last long haul flight and its last one from New York City.

Services
In July 1997, Jaro was flying to three intercontinental and 17 European destinations:

North America: Montreal, New York City and Toronto

Europe: Bucharest, Düsseldorf, Vienna, Frankfurt, Girona, Hanover, London, Ostend (cargo only), Hamburg, Skopje, Palma de Mallorca, Berlin, Malta, Cologne, Southend (cargo only), Stockholm

Fleet
(at July 2000)
3 Boeing 707 (one cargo)
2 BAC 1-11
1 Yakovlev Yak-42

External links
Photos on airliners.net

References

Defunct airlines of Romania
Airlines established in 1991
Airlines disestablished in 2001
Romanian companies established in 1991